John P. Lomenzo (August 12, 1915 – June 7, 2004, Rochester, Monroe County, New York) was an American lawyer and politician.

Life
He graduated from Niagara University and Fordham University School of Law, and was admitted to the bar in 1939. He was a judge of the Monroe County Court when he was the Republican candidate for New York State Comptroller in 1962. He was defeated by the incumbent Democrat Arthur Levitt Sr., but was appointed Secretary of State of New York by Governor Nelson A. Rockefeller on August 22, 1963, and stayed in office until he resigned in December 1973 and was replaced by Governor Malcolm Wilson after Rockefeller's resignation. In 1970-71, he was the President of the National Association of Secretaries of State. He was an alternate delegate to the 1964 Republican National Convention.

Since 1975, he had been a director of Conair Corporation. He was a partner in the law firm of Field, Lomenzo & Turret.

His son John P. Lomenzo Jr., has been Town Court Justice of Penfield, New York since 1995.

Sources
 Obit notice, in NYT on June 11, 2004
 SEC file on Conair, at Edgar on-line
 Political Graveyard
 Monroe County Bar pays tribute to deceased colleagues, in Daily Record (Rochester, NY) on November 30, 2004
 Fordham alumni notes

1915 births
2004 deaths
New York (state) Republicans
Secretaries of State of New York (state)
Fordham University School of Law alumni
20th-century American politicians